Aleixo Corte-Real (1886 – May 1943), better known under the name of Dom Aleixo, was a noble Timorese chieftain (régulo) and a Portuguese hero during World War II.

Biography

Dom Aleixo was born in Soro, Ainaro, Portuguese Timor.  His birth name was Nai-Sesu. Corte-Real was the cousin of Nai-Cau, during the rebellion of Manufahi stood on the side of Portugal. Here Aleixo already fought 1911-1912 on the part of the Portuguese against Boaventura, the Liurai of Manufahi. Dom Aleixo become the Liurai of Ainaro after 1912. In 1931 he converted to the Catholic faith and was baptized. In 1934 he represented Portuguese Timor at the Grand Colonial Exhibition in Porto. In 1942 Japan occupied the island of Timor. Australia began to organize resistance against the Japanese and built it on the support of the local population. However, there was also the Colunas Negras (the black columns): Timorese militiamen who terrorized the civilian population for the Japanese by the end of the occupation. Dom Aleixo Corte-Real led a major revolt against the Japanese. In 1943, he was surrounded by the Colunas Negras and regular Japanese troops. He fought until the ammunition ran out and was captured. Shortly thereafter, Aleixo and his family were shot because he remained faithful to the Portuguese regime and the Portuguese flag.

On October 30, 1946, he was made Commander of the Military Order of Torre e Espada, of Valor, Loyalty and Merit posthumously. At the district headquarters in Ainaro a monument was erected to this Timorese hero that is still in good condition. The Dom Aleixo Subdistrict in the Dili district was named in his honor. A series of banknotes of 2000$00, 50$00, 100$00, 500$00 and 1000$00 escudos from Portuguese Timor were printed with his image.

See also 
 Battle of Timor

Literature 
 Humberto Leitão, O Régulo Timorense D. Aleixo Corte-Real Edição do Corpo de Estudos da História da Marinha, 1979.

References

1886 births
1943 deaths
Converts to Roman Catholicism from pagan religions
East Timorese people of Portuguese descent
East Timorese Roman Catholics
People from Ainaro District